American Legion Soldier is a public artwork by German-born American artist Adolph Wolter, located at the American Legion building on K Street, N.W. in Washington, D.C., United States. "American Legion Soldier" was surveyed as part of the Smithsonian's Save Outdoor Sculpture! program in 1993.

Description

This sculpture depicts a male figure dressed in a combination of World War I and World War II battle fatigues. His shirt is unbuttoned and dogtags hang around his neck. A rifle is slung over his right shoulder and he holds a grenade in his left hand. He wears a helmet on his head and his pants are tucked into his boots. He steps on a snake with his right foot, the snake represents the enemy. The sculpture is installed on a small ledge on the facade of the American Legion building, forty feet above the sidewalk.

Artist

Information

The model for the sculpture was Lt. Hulon B. Whittington who won a Medal of Honor in World War II. The sculpture, which was carved by Frank Bowden, was carved in ninety days at Adolph Wolter's studio in Indianapolis, Indiana.

Acquisition

The sculpture cost $5,200 to produce and erect. It was dedicated on August 14, 1951, and President Harry S. Truman spoke at the dedication ceremony.

See also
 List of public art in Washington, D.C., Ward 2

References

Outdoor sculptures in Washington, D.C.
1951 sculptures
 
Limestone statues in the United States